Omassery is a town in Kozhikode district, Kerala, India and it is a junction between Thiruvambady, Thamarassery, Mukkam, Koduvally, Kodenchery and Kattangal. Omassery is located 29 kilometers southeast of Kozhikode in the eastern part of Kerala; better known as Malabar (Northern Kerala). Omassery is a fast developing place and is well connected to the other parts of the state. Besides that, it is known as the gateway to the hill ranges of Western Ghats in Malabar.

Geography

The total area of the Panchayat is

Demographics
As of 2001 census the total population of the panchayat is 25,420, which constitute 12511 Males and 12909 females. The population density is 998 per km2 which is more than the state average. The sex ratio is 1000:1032. The people are highly literate. The literacy rate is 88.05 (Male: 93.62 and female 82.76).

Towns and suburbs of Omassery
Koduvally, Kunnamangalam, Thamarassery, Mukkam, Thiruvambady, Kodenchery, NIT(REC)

Koodathai, Venappara, Neeleswaram, Ambalakkandy, Vennakode, Malayamma, Velimanna, Kallurutty, Puthur, north puthur Nadammal Poyil and Manipuram.

Panchayath Wards and present members
Omassery Panchayath consists of 19 wards. In ward number order, with ward, member name and party indicated:

 Koodathai		Shyni (Koodahai)		
 Kakkadakunnu	Shyni Babu (CPIM)	
 Chemmaruthai	Manu E J (INC)		
 Peruvilly		Gracy (INC)	
 Korothiri		Girija Sumod Kumar (CPIM)	
 Omassery EAST	CA Ayisha Teacher (Independent)	
 Omassery WEST	P.V. Abdu Rahiman Master (IUML)		
 Ambalakkandy	yoonus ambalakkandy	(IUML)	
 Allumthara	Suharabi Nechooli (IUML)		
 Vennakkode	C.K. Kkadeeja Muhammed (IUML)
 NadammalPoyil	M.C. Rafeenathulukhan (IUML)		
 Kaniyarkandam	Paranghottil Ibrahim (INDEPENDENT)
 Kulathakkara	Sainudheen Bappu (IUML)	
 Velimanna		Thatha (IUML)		
 Puthur.	 Abdul Nasar Pulikkal (IUML)		
 Mangad WEST		Chandramathi Puthanpurayil (CPIM)	
 Mangad EAST		Sre Eba Areekkal (CPIM)	
 Chakkikave		T.T. Mandjkumar (CPIM)	
 Meppally		K.K. Radakrishnan (CPIM)

Major Institutions
 Al irshad Arts And Science, College Thechyad Omassery
 G U P S Puthur
 Wadihuda Higher Secondary School (Unaided), Omassery
 Al Irshad Technical Higher Secondary School, Techyad Omassery
 Vidya Poshini ALP School, Omassery
 Vadihuda English School (CBSE), Omassery
 Al Irshad Central School (English Medium), Techyad Omassery
 Al Irshad High School (Malayalam Medium), Techyad Omassery
 Al Irshad Industrial School, Techyad Omassery
 Santhi School of Nursing, Omassery
  Santhi Paramedical Training Centre, Omassery
 Wadihuda Arabic College, Omassery
 Pleasant English School Omassery
 Pleasant Arts College., Omassery
 Al Irshad Women's College, Techyad Omassery
 Vadihuda Orphanage & Destitute Home, Omassery
 Izzathul Islam Madrassa, Omassery
 Winpoint Guidance Academy, Omassery
 Santhi College of Nursing, Omassery
 G.M.U.P. School Velimanna Omassery
 Sunanul Huda Madrasa, Omassery
 Badrul Huda Madrasa, Thazhe Omassery
 Al Madrasathul Islamiya, Omassery
 G.M.L.P. School Kedayathur
 Holy Family Venappara
 St. Mary's Higher Secondary School Koodathai
 Almanar Arabic College Omassery
 Track College Omassery
DELTA PLUS INSTITUTE OF SCIENCE

Nonprofit organisations 
 Karma Disaster Management Team, Omassery, a group of young energetic members who are ready to serve all peoples in need in any emergency situations.
 Sevana Charitable Society, Omassery
 Shihab Thangal Memorial Charitable Trust (SMCT), Omassery
 CMCO GCC, Cholakkal Mahall Charity Omassery, an initiation by 200+ peoples from Omassery Cholakkal Mahall who works in GCC countries
 Karunyam, a charity initiative by youths in Omassery.
 Karuna Charitable Society
 Youth Wing Puthoor
 Sukrutham, a charity initiative by Santi Hospital Omassery for the Kidney patients of the underprivileged sections of the society whose numbers are increasing day by day. Since its inception in May 2008 m ore than 2000 dialysis have been conducted out of which 68% received concession.
 Pain and Palliative Care Clinic, a clinic guided by the Pain and Palliative Society of Calicut, Government Medical College which has a team of highly qualified and trained doctors accompanied by nurses and volunteers. The clinic was incepted in the year 2003, until now more than 250 patients have been registered in the clinic and among them about 55% were cancer patients.

Hospitals 
 Santhi Hospital Omassery, a 300 bedded hospital multi-specialty hospital.
 Govt. Community Health Centre, Omassery
 Govt. Ayurveda Dispensary, Omassery (Koodathai Bazar)
 Govt. Homeo Dispensary, Omassery 
 Govt. Veterinary Hospital Thazhe Omassery

Other clinics 
 Taj Yunani Clinic, Omassery
 Similiya Homeo Clinic, Omassery
 Dr Sudhir's Clinic, Thazhe Omasseri
 Calicut Center for Advanced Mental Health Care and Psychotherapy, Venappara
 Nagarjuna Ayurveda Oushadhasala, Omassery
 Good Life Ayurveda clinic Thazhe Omassery
 Darussyifa Ayurveda clinic Omassery
 Mother's Clinic Koduvally road Omassery
 Dr Mohandas evening clinic
 Areekyal Vaidhyar

Banks
 Esaf Bank Omassery
 Federal Bank, Omassery
 Kerala Gramin Bank, Omassery
 Kerala Bank, Omassery
 Omassery Merchantile co-operative Bank Omassery
 Omassery Regional Agriculture Society Omassery
 Omassery Service Co-Op. Bank
 Omassery Urban Society Bank Omassery
 State Bank Of India, Omassery

Non-banking financial companies

 Manappuram Finance Ltd Omassery
 Muthoot Fincorp Omassery
 Koshamattam finance Omassery
 MAXVALUE Credits and Investment Omassery

Religious places 
 Anwarul Islam Masjid Omassery
 Chokur Sree Rama Temple
 Cholakkal Juma Masjid, Omassery
 Holy Family Church, Venappara
 Kaniyar Kandam Juma Masjid
 Koovvchalil Masjid
 Nadukil Shiva temple
 Pazhedath Shiva Temple
 Puthur Subrahmanya temple, Mangad
 Rayarukandy Sunni Masjid, Omassery
 Thechyad Juma Masjid
 Velimanna Juma Masjid

Transport 

By Air
Calicut International Airport (Karipur), the nearest airport is just 36 kilometres away from this area. 
By Train
The nearest Railway station is at Kozhikode.

How to reach by road
 Thiruvananthapuram - Kochi - Guruvayoor/Thrissur - Pattambi - Perinthalmanna - Manjeri - Areekode - Mukkam - Omassery
 Kozhikode - Kunnamangalam - REC (NIT) / Koduvally - Omassery
 Koyilandy - Thamarassery - Omassery
 Wayanad - Adivaram - Thamarassery - Omassery
 Nilambur - Areekode - Mukkam - Omassery
 Thusharagiri - Kodenchery - Omassery
 Kakkadampoyil - Koombarakoodaranji - Thiruvambady - Omassery

Omassery is the crossing of State Highways Koyilandy - Edavanna and Kappad-Thusharagiri-Adivaram. The location is well connected by roads from various corners and is a main junction for surrounding various panchayaths and villages. Moreover, it gives more geographical importance to this place as this is an important gateway to the hill ranges of western Ghat of Malabar. Thiruvambady, Thamarassery, Koduvally, Mukkam and Kodencheri are near by places of Omassery.

There is one bus stand and bus services available to places such as Kozhikode, Mukkam, Koduvally, Thamarassery, Thiruvambady, Kodenchery, Anakkampoyil.

The Kilometer chart from Kozhikode to Omassery is given below.

The Kilometer chart through road from Omassery is given below.

See also
 Aripara Falls
 Thusharagiri Falls

References

External links

 Omassery Panchayath
 General Information -Omassery
 ചോലക്കല്‍ മഹല്ല്

Thamarassery area
Panchayats in Koduvally Block